Liga Indonesia Second Division (Indonesian: Divisi Dua Liga Indonesia) is the fourth level football league in Indonesian football competition system. Currently, this competition, along with First Division and Third Division, is managed by the Amateur League Board of the Football Association of Indonesia (PSSI).


First round

Second round

Third round 

Qualify team (after Oktober 15):PS Bungo dan PS Pasaman Barat (group C, Sumatran zone), Persap Purbalingga dan Persibas Banyumas (group D, Java zone), Persenga Nganjuk dan PSGC Ciamis (group E, Java zone), Persekap Kota Pasuruan dan Perseba Bangkalan (group F, Java zone), Perseta Tulung Agung dan PSID Jombang (group G, Java zone), PS Penajam Paser Utara (group H, Kalimantan zone), Perseka Kaimana dan Persemi Mimika (group I, Papua zone).

3rd round of the second division competition will consist of 18 teams divided into four groups. Namely, the group K, L, M and N. Group K will consist of six teams, while three other groups each containing four teams.

Sumatra Zone

(best 4 team qualify for 4th round and Promoted)

Group K in Kuantan Singingi
PS Pidie Jaya
Persiks Kuantan Singingi
PS Bungo
Persal South Aceh
PS West Pasaman
Poslab Labuhan Batu

Java Zone

(best 4 team qualify for 4th round and Promoted)

(competition play with home tournament system in 2 group league format)

Group L in Nganjuk
Persap Purbalingga
Persenga Nganjuk
Persibas Banyumas
PSGC Ciamis

Group M in Jenggelo Stadium, Sidoarjo
Persekap Pasuruan City
Perseba Bangkalan
Perseta Tulung Agung
PSID Jombang

Kalimantan Zone

(Champions team qualify for 4th round and Promoted)

(this competition is a 2nd round for this Zone)
North Penajam Paser FC
Persikutim East Kutai
Tapin Regency FC
Persehan Marabahan

Southeast Nusa League

(Champions team qualify for 4th round and Promoted)

(competition play with home and away system in league format)

(this competition is a qualification tournament for this Zone)
Persisum Sumbawa
Persap Alor
Persilotim East Lombok
Persikobi Bima
Mataram FC

(best 2 team qualify for 4th round and Promoted)

Group N in Biak
Perseka Kaimana (West Papua)
Persewar Waropen (Papua) (2010 Third Division Champions)
Persiss Sorong (West Papua)
Persemi Mimika (disqualification) (Papua)
Persepan Paniai (Papua)
Persidago Gorontralo (retreat) (Sulawesi)
Persma Manado (disqualification) (Sulawesi)

Bold is team promoted to 2011 First Division

Fourth Round 

Qualify teams :

Sumatra Zone
PS Bungo
Persiks Kuantan Singingi
PS Pidie Jaya
Persal South Aceh
Java Zone
Persenga Nganjuk
Persebangga Purbalingga
Perseba Bangkalan
Persekap Pasuruan City
Kalimantan Zone
North Penajam Paser FC
Southeast Nusa Zone
Persisum Sumbawa
East Indonesia
Persewar Waropen
Perseka Kaimana

Fourth stage

Participate is 3 grub winner and 1 best runner-up from third stage. Total 4 clubs will participate in this stage.

Qualify teams
PS Bungo
Persewar Waropen
Persebangga Purbalingga
Perseka Kaimana

Knockout Phase

Semifinal

Final stage

References

External links 
 Official Website Indonesia Amatir League Board 

2010-11
4